Dragon tiger phoenix is a classic Cantonese cuisine dish found almost exclusively in regions such as Guangdong.

Etymology
The name of the dish comes from the use of three animals.  The dragon is represented by snake, tiger is represented by cat (sometimes masked palm civet is substituted) and phoenix is represented by chicken.

Types
There are a few varieties of the dish.  One version is literally called the "dragon tiger phoenix big braise".  Another is the chrysanthemum dragon tiger phoenix".

See also
 Ye wei

References

Cantonese cuisine
Chinese chicken dishes
Snake products